Benildus Romançon, F.S.C. (14 June 1805 – 13 August 1862) was a French schoolteacher and member of the Brothers of the Christian Schools who has been declared a saint by the Catholic Church. His feast day is 13 August.

Life
He was born Pierre Romançon on 14 June 1805, in the town of Thuret, Puy-de-Dôme, in France to a farming family. A small and frail-looking boy, he was not cut out physically to be a farmer, but his enrollment in a Christian Brothers school at Riom led him to his calling as a teacher. He was so far ahead of his classmates in elementary school that when he was only 14 years old the Brothers often assigned him as a substitute teacher.

He joined the Brothers in 1820 and served at several Brothers’ schools in south-central France. In 1841 he was appointed Director of a school in Saugues, an isolated village on a barren plateau in southern France. For the next twenty years he worked quietly and effectively as teacher and principal to educate the boys in the village and some from the neighboring farms, many of whom were in their teens and had never been to school before.

Small as he was, he was known as a strict but fair disciplinarian. He also looked after his students by preparing meals in the Brothers’ kitchen for hungry students, converting old Brothers’ robes into coats or pants for them, and spending hours tutoring students who learned more slowly than others. He referred to all students, regardless of age or background, as "Monsieur."

In time the little school became the center of the social and intellectual life of the village, with evening classes for the adults and tutoring for the less gifted students. Brother Benilde’s extraordinary religious sense was evident to everyone: at Mass with the students in the parish church, teaching catechism, preparing boys for first communion, visiting and praying with the sick, and rumors of near-miraculous cures. He was especially effective in attracting religious vocations. At his death, on 13 August 1862, more than 200 Brothers and an impressive number of priests had been his students at Saugues.

Veneration
Benildus was beatified on 4 April 1948 by Pope Pius XII, who mentioned that his sanctification was attained by enduring "the terrible daily grind" and by "doing common things in an uncommon way". He was canonized by Pope Paul VI on 29 October 1967, becoming the first Brother of the Institute to be canonized and the second saint after Jean Baptiste de La Salle.

A shrine was built in the parish church in Sauges to honor his remains.

St Benildus is one of four House Patrons at La Salle Catholic College, Bankstown, New South Wales. He is a patron of teachers.

Educational institutions named after Saint Benilde
 De La Salle–College of Saint Benilde – Manila, Philippines
 St. Benilde School – Bacolod, Philippines
 St. Benilde School – Louisiana, United States
 Benilde-St. Margaret's School – St Louis Park, Minnesota, US
 St Benildus College Dublin, Ireland 
 Saint Benilde International School
 Colegio de San Benildo 
 School of Saint Brother Benilde
 College of San Benildo - Rizal

References

External links
Saint Benildus at the Patron Saints Index

1805 births
1862 deaths
People from Puy-de-Dôme
French educators
19th-century French people
Canonized Roman Catholic religious brothers
Burials in Haute-Loire
French Roman Catholic saints
Lasallian saints
19th-century Christian saints
Canonizations by Pope Paul VI